Ted Jack Kaptchuk (born August 17, 1947) is an American medical researcher who holds professorships in medicine and in global health and social medicine at Harvard Medical School. He researches the placebo effect within the field of placebo studies.

Early life and education
Kaptchuk was born in Brooklyn, New York; his parents were both Polish Holocaust survivors. He holds a B.A. in East Asian Studies from Columbia University, where he co-founded the university's chapter of Students for a Democratic Society, and a degree in Chinese medicine from the Macao Institute of Chinese Medicine.

Career
Kaptchuk had an herbal and acupuncture clinic in Boston for many years starting in 1976. In the 1980s he was clinical director of the Pain Unit at Lemuel Shattuck Hospital. In 1990, he became associate director of the Center for Alternative Medicine Research and Education at Beth Israel Deaconess Medical Center, also in Boston. In 2011, he became Director of the Harvard Program in Placebo Studies and the Therapeutic Encounter at Beth Israel Deaconess. Although he does not have an allopathic medical degree, he has been a faculty member at Harvard Medical School since 1998, a professor of medicine since 2013, and professor of global health and social medicine since 2015.

Working with Kathryn T. Hall and others Kaptchuk has led many studies of the placebo effect, including the role of genetic markers that identify people who people who respond best to placebos.  Some of this work suggests that placebos may still work despite disclosure that they are placebos.

Kaptchuk has served on panels for the NIH and FDA, and worked as a medical writer for the BBC. He has written more than 300 peer-reviewed publications.

Kaptchuk has been awarded three Lifetime Achievement Awards including Society of Acupuncture in 2015, Society of Interdisciplinary Placebo Studies in 2021, and the William Silen Lifetime Achievement Award in Mentoring from Harvard Medical School in 2022.

Personal life
Kaptchuk is an observant Jew.

Books 
 The Web That Has No Weaver: Understanding Chinese Medicine, New York: McGraw-Hill, 1983. 
 The Healing Arts: Exploring the Medical Ways of the World, Summit Books, 1987. 
Miller FG, Colloca L, Crouch RA, Kaptchuk TJ (eds).  The Placebo: A Reader.  Baltimore: Johns Hopkins University Press, 2013.

References

Selected publications
All the world's a stage: including the doctor's office: National Public Radio's Hidden Brain. 
Placebo: Can the mind cure you?  https://gimletmedia.com/shows/science-vs/5whgzd/placebo-can-the-mind-cure-you

External links 
Personal website

1947 births
Living people
Harvard Medical School faculty
Placebo researchers
Alternative medicine researchers
American people of Ukrainian descent